The Dongola gerbil (Gerbillus dongolanus) is a rodent distributed mainly in Dongola, Sudan.It is sometimes considered conspecific with the greater Egyptian gerbil.

References

  Database entry includes a brief justification of why this species is listed as data deficient

Gerbillus
Rodents of Africa
Mammals described in 1877
Taxobox binomials not recognized by IUCN